Kirov Railway (Kirovskaya zheleznaya doroga, until 1935 Murman Railway) is a  broad gauge Russian railway network that links the Murman Coast and Murmansk city (in the north) and Saint Petersburg (in the south). The railway is operated by the Arktika passenger train. It has 52 stations. The line is of vital military importance because of Murmansk being an ice-free port on the Arctic Sea. The northern part between Petrozavodsk and Kola was built in 1915–1917, due to a lack of workers under assignment of an increasing number of German and Austrian war prisoners. In 1941–1943 the central part between Svir and Petrozavodsk was occupied by the Finnish Army under orders from Mannerheim during the Second World War. Originally called the Murman Railway, the line was renamed the Kirov Railway in 1935 in honor of Sergei Kirov, a prominent Bolshevik leader of the Russian revolution, who had been assassinated the year before. The railway was electrified in 2005.

See also 
 Murmansk–Nikel Railway
 List of named passenger trains of Russia

External links

Railway lines in Russia
Rail transport in Murmansk Oblast